The Eskişehir Cup is a professional tennis tournament played on outdoor hard courts. It is currently part of the ATP Challenger Tour.
The first edition took place in July 2013. The second edition took place in May 2015.

Past finals

Singles

Doubles

External links
 2013 tournament draws
 2015 tournament draws

 
ATP Challenger Tour
Hard court tennis tournaments
Tennis tournaments in Turkey